Catharine of Burgundy (Montbard, 1378 – Dijon, 26 January 1425) was the second daughter of Philip the Bold, Duke of Burgundy and Margaret III, Countess of Flanders. She was Duchess of Further Austria.

She was married on 15 August 1393 with Leopold IV, Duke of Austria, gaining the county of Ferrette for her dowry. Following Leopold's death in 1411, his brother Frederick occupied the county of Ferrette despite Catherine and her nephew Duke Philip of Burgundy's negotiations.  She lived mainly in her residence in the Alsace, close to her native Burgundy. The marriage remained childless.

Around 1415, she remarried with Maximilian Smassmann von Rappoltstein. This marriage also remained childless and they divorced in 1421. 
She was buried in the Chartreuse de Champmol.

Ancestry

References

External links 
 Genealogical database by herbert Stoyan at Uni-Erlangen
 

House of Valois-Burgundy
Burials at Champmol
1378 births
1425 deaths